Christopher Colquhoun (born  in Carlisle, England) is an English actor who trained at RADA. He is known for appearing as Simon Kaminski in the BBC drama series Casualty, from 2002 to 2004. He also appeared in Holby City in this role as well. He also played Jake Quinn in The Bill for two episodes – "An Honour to Serve", parts 1 and 2, and appeared as pathologist Dr Tony Carmichael in the seventh season of Vera, screened during 2017.

He played Hector in William Shakespeare's play Troilus & Cressida, which was shown in the 2009 season (until September 20) in Shakespeare's Globe theatre in London.  On 4 December 2009 he joined the cast of Coronation Street.

In 2014, he played Joff in The Believers at the Tricycle, London, and Scar in The Lion King (musical) on its UK tour.

From 2017 to 2020, he has played Special Agent Derek Crown in the TV series Absentia.

References

External links
Official Website

Alumni of RADA
Living people
Black British male actors
People from Carlisle, Cumbria
British male stage actors
English male soap opera actors
English male Shakespearean actors
English male stage actors
English people of Kenyan descent
Year of birth missing (living people)